Kaliwungu. Is a Village in the town of Mandiraja, Banjarnegara Regency, Central Java Province, Indonesia. This Village has an area of 529,73 hectares and a population of 3.479 inhabitants in 2010.

References

External link
 Banjarnegara Regency Official Website
 BPS Kabupaten Banjarnegara

Banjarnegara Regency
Villages in Central Java